Nationality words link to articles with information on the nation's poetry or literature (for instance, Irish or France).

Events

Works published

United Kingdom
 Mark Akenside, An Ode to the Earl of Huntingdon
 Robert Dodsley, editor, first three volumes of A Collection of Poems (1748–58), Volume 2 includes Thomas Gray's "Ode [on the Spring]", "Ode on the Death of a Favourite Cat, Drowned in a Tub of Gold Fishes" and "Ode on a Distant Prospect of Eton College" (first published separately 1747)
 William Kenrick, The Town
 Mary Leapor, Poems upon Several Occasions (1748–51), posthumous
 Ambrose Philips, Pastorals, Epistles, Odes and Other Original Poems
 Thomas Sheridan, The Simile; or, Woman: a Cloud, published posthumously
 James Thomson, The Castle of Indolence: An Allegorical Poem. Written in Imitation of Spenser., a mock-Spenserian poem; published by Andrew Millar (see also "Deaths", below)
 Thomas Warton, the elder, Poems on Several Occasions, published posthumously, edited by Joseph Warton, who also included two of his own odes

Other
 Johann Jakob Bodmer, Proben der alten schwäbischen Poesie des dreyzehnten Jahrhunderts. Aus der Manessischen Sammlung, German-language anthology published in Switzerland

Births
Death years link to the corresponding "[year] in poetry" article:
 January 1 (disputed — see explanation here) – Gottfried August Bürger (died 1794), German poet
 June 14 – Henry Alline (died 1784), American-born Canadian preacher and hymn-writer
 October 13 – Henry Livingston, Jr. (died 1828), American farmer and poet; his family later claim he, not Clement Moore, is the author of "The Night Before Christmas"
 December 21 – Ludwig Christoph Heinrich Hölty (died 1776), German poet and lyricist
 Also – Hugh Henry Brackenridge (died 1816), Scottish-born American writer, poet, lawyer, judge and Pennsylvania Supreme Court justice

Deaths

Death years link to the corresponding "[year] in poetry" article:
 February 21 – Antoine Danchet (born 1671), French playwright, librettist and dramatic poet
 April 13 – Christopher Pitt (born 1699), English poet and translator
 August 27 – James Thomson, 47 (born 1700), Scottish-born poet and playwright, author of the words to "Rule Britannia!"
 November 25 – Isaac Watts (born 1674), English "Father of English Hymnody"
 Also – Mohammed Awzal (born 1670), Moroccan religious Berber poet

See also

Poetry
List of years in poetry
List of years in literature

Notes

18th-century poetry
Poetry